Alhaji (Dr) Mamman Shata (born in 1900 in Musawa, Katsina State, Nigeria, died on 18 June 1999) was a Nigerian singer.

He was a well-known griot/musician among the Hausa people of West Africa. His vocals were often accompanied by talking drums, known as kalangu. He performed for the Hausa people of Northern Nigeria and even non-Hausas for more than half a century.

Early life
Mamman Shata was born to a family of  Fulani tribe. His mother, Lariya, was a Fulata-Borno, the Fulani people who migrated from the Borno Empire after the Fulani Jihad of 1804 and settled in parts of Hausaland. She was born in Tofa town in the Kano Emirate and met Shata's father, Ibrahim Yaro, when she went to visit a relative in Musawa. Subsequently, they got married. Lariya had a son, Ali, from a previous marriage and had two children with Yaro, Mamman Shata and his sister Yalwa.

Ibrahim Yaro was also of the Fulani ethnic group. His own ancestors came from Sanyinna in the Sokoto area. They had migrated to the Katsina area and settled in the forests around the present Musawa area. They were credited with the founding of Musawa itself, with Musa, their head, founding a small settlement that was subsequently named after him.

Shata went to an Islamic school in Musawa as a boy, according to Hausa Muslim tradition.

Musawa village was under the Katsina Native Authority (N.A.) when Shata was born. When the Local Governments were created it came under Kankia Local Government. Today, Musawa is a Local Government Area of its own in Katsina State.

Ibrahim Yaro did not want his son to become a musician due to widely held belief that music or praise-singing was a form of 'roko' or begging. His father, being a Fulani man, wanted the young Shata to become a farmer or a trader, either of which was a more dignified occupation. Shata's insistence on becoming a musician was therefore seen as a rebellion against the norm.

Music career
Mamman Shata acquired his sobriquet of 'Shata' from a man called Baba Salamu, a relative of his. Shata as a young man was engaged in selling kola nuts and after the sale he would share the profit to people he met on his way home or in the market and came back empty handed. Whenever he was asked what he did with the money he made, he would answer, "Na yi shata da su," i.e. he had given it away. As a result, Baba Salamu started calling him 'Mai-Shata', meaning one who fritters away his gains.

Later, Shata went into the trade of selling sweets ('alewa').

Shata began singing with other youth for fun at the village square ("dandali") after the evening meal. His prowess grew until he outshone the other youngsters. But he was doing that not for any monetary gain; it was merely a vocation for the youngsters.

Later he abandoned both the sweets-selling trade and embraced music or praise-singing full-time. This vocation took him to many villages in the Musawa area. Finally, he settled in Bakori after his benefactor, Abdullahi Inde, a prince of Musawa who was working there as a Native Authority official in charge of buying cotton and groundnuts, asked him to move other there. In Bakori, Shata married his first wife, Iya, whose real name was Binta. They had a daughter, Amina, who died in infancy. From his base in Bakori, Shata traveled with his band to places as far away as Katsina, Sokoto and Kano, which he first visited in the late '40s. In 1952 his stardom began to manifest in Kano after he performed at a wedding party known as "Bikin 'Yan Sarki" (Wedding of the Princes) where some 12 notable Kano princes married. In 1960 he moved to Funtua, a more cosmopolitan town not far from Bakori. Shata made Funtua his home for about forty years - up until his death.

Mamman Shata was one of the best selling Polygram artistes from the north from the 1950s up till the 1980s. He was a highly respected folklorist. He spent about 50–60 years in the music industry.

Shata could not recall or remember the number of songs he produced, but they are believed to be in thousands. Many of his songs, especially those he produced in his teens, were not recorded.

He visited many countries, especially in West Africa. Outside the continent he was in Saudi Arabia for the Hajj pilgrimage but he also visited the United Kingdom, France and the United States of America.

Shata was famed to have sung for every topic under the Hausa land's sun: agriculture, culture, religion, economy, politics, military, morality and etiquettes, animals, trade, etc.

He received many awards, including those from the Federal Government (which gave him the Member of the Order of the Niger, MON), the Performing Musicians Association of Nigeria (PMAN), the Kano State Government, the U.S. Embassy in Nigeria, University of California, Los Angeles, an honorary doctorate degree by Ahmadu Bello University in recognition of his contribution to both national development and letters, and a posthumous Millennium Award from the government of Goodluck Jonathan.

His relationship with other musicians was mixed. He had serious disagreements with some, such as Ahmadu Doka, Mammalo Shata and Musa Danbade, but generally he maintained a cordial relationship with most singers, who regarded him as a leader.

Some of his notable benefactors were the Emir of Katsina, Alhaji Usman Nagogo, the Emir of Daura, Alhaji Muhammadu Bashar, Mammada Dan Sambo, Emir of Kano, Alhaji Ado Bayero; Sultan of Sokoto, Muhammadu Maccido; Jarma of Kano, Alhaji Muhammadu Adamu Dankabo; and Emir of Zazzau, Alhaji Shehu Idris.

Political career
Shata participated actively in partisan politics throughout his life. His politics was largely left-wing even though his benefactors (the royal and the business classes) were mostly on the right. He ascribed this to his humble background. In the First Republic in the 1950s he aligned himself to the left-wing NEPU as opposed to the right-wing NPC of Sir Ahmadu Bello and the emirs. He replicated that in later years. In the 1970s, he won an election, becoming a Councillor under Kankia Local Government Area of the then Kaduna State. In the Second Republic (in the '80s) he was first in the centre-of-right GNPP and then moved to the conservative ruling party, the NPN. In the Third Republic he was elected as the chairman of SDP in Funtua Local Government Area, a position from which he was impeached due to his left-wing character and brush with the party's main benefactor in Katsina State, retired Major-General Shehu Musa Yar'Adua. Shata did not participate much in the politics that ushered in the civilian government of Chief Olusegun Obasanjo in 1999 due to ill-health.

Death
Alhaji Shata suffered a debilitating illness that made him to be hospitalised in Kano and Jeddah, Saudi Arabia. After some relief following an operation on his urethra in Jeddah, he was hospitalised in the Aminu Kano Teaching Hospital, Kano, where he died on Friday, 18 June 1999. He was survived by three wives (Furera, Hadiza, and Binta), 19 children, and 28 grandchildren. He was buried that day in Daura, the city of his benefactor, Emir Muhammadu Bashar, who attended the funeral.

In his lifetime, Shata had married many other women and divorced them, some with children between them. Amina, the third of his wives when he died, never gave birth even though she lived with him for more than 10 years.

References

Further reading

1923 births
1999 deaths
Date of birth missing
Hausa people
Nigerian male musicians
Nigerian politicians
People from Katsina State
Griots
Hausa-language singers
20th-century male musicians